Strikeforce: Rockhold vs. Jardine was a mixed martial arts event held by Strikeforce. The event took place on January 7, 2012 at the Hard Rock Hotel and Casino in Paradise, Nevada, part of the Las Vegas Metropolitan Area, United States.

Background
Beginning with this event, the preliminary matches aired live on the Showtime Extreme channel prior to the main card airing on Showtime.

Miesha Tate was expected to defend her Women's Bantamweight Championship in a rematch with former champion Sarah Kaufman on this card, but the bout never materialized.

Luke Rockhold was expected to defend his Strikeforce Middleweight Championship against Tim Kennedy at this event, though an injury left Kennedy unable to compete at this event, and he was replaced by Keith Jardine in his middleweight debut. The Rockhold/Kennedy bout was rescheduled for Strikeforce: Rockhold vs. Kennedy that July, where Rockhold defended his title via unanimous decision.

Bobby Green was originally scheduled to face Strikeforce newcomer Alonzo Martinez at this event, but had to withdraw due to an injury. He was replaced by Estevan Payan, also making his promotional debut.

Results

Salaries
Luke Rockhold: $90,000 (Includes $25,000 win bonus)
Keith Jardine: $30,000
Robbie Lawler: $150,000
Adlan Amagov: $10,000
Muhammed Lawal: $95,000(Includes $15,000 win bonus)
Lorenz Larkin: $17,000
Tyron Woodley: $60,000(Includes $30,000 win bonus)
Jordan Mein: $9,000
Tarec Saffiedine: $31,000 (Includes $15,500 win bonus)
Tyler Stinson: $4,000
Nah-Shon Burrell: $8,000 (Includes $4,000 win bonus)
James Terry: $9,000
Gian Villante: $20,000 (Includes $10,000 win bonus)
Trevor Smith: $4,000
Ricky Legere Jr.: $10,000(Includes $5,000 win bonus)
Christopher Spang: $6,000
Estevan Payan: $8,000 (Includes $4,000 win bonus)
Alonzo Martinez: $5,000

References

Rockhold vs. Jardine
2012 in mixed martial arts
Mixed martial arts in Las Vegas
2012 in sports in Nevada
Hard Rock Hotel and Casino (Las Vegas)
Events in Paradise, Nevada